LaVerne Allers (born c. 1945) is a former American football guard at the University of Nebraska. He was a consensus All-American in 1966.

Early life
Allers was born in Davenport, Iowa around 1945 to Mr. and Mrs. Louis Allers.  He attend Davenport West High School where he was fullback on the football team under coach Bob Liddy.  He also lettered twice in both basketball and wrestling.

College career
Allers attended the University of Nebraska and majored in soil conservation.   
He lettered for the Nebraska Cornhuskers football team under coach Bob Devaney during the 1964, 1965, and 1966 seasons.  He made All-Big-8 team in both the 1965 and 1966 seasons.  In his senior year, as a 6-foot, 0-inch, 209-pound guard, Allers was recognized as a consensus first-team All-American, having received first-team honors from several publications and organizations including the  Associated Press (AP), and United Press International (UPI).

References

American football guards
All-American college football players
Nebraska Cornhuskers football players
Players of American football from Iowa
Sportspeople from Davenport, Iowa
Year of birth missing (living people)
Living people